éVoid is the first album by South African rock group, éVoid.

Prior to its release, record company WEA (now the Warner Music Group) in August 1983 released the single, "Shadows", backed with "Dun Kalusin Ta Va". "Shadows" peaked at number three on the national charts in November.

It was followed up in February 1984 with "Taximan", which reached no. 6 on the South African hit parade. Later that year, "I Am a Fadget" was released as the band’s third single.

By September 1984, the album was riding high at the top of the charts, which was rare for home-grown acts more used to living in the shadow of overseas artists.

At the country's annual Sarie Awards for 1984, éVoid took the award for “best arrangement and production of an album”, while the single “I Am a Fadget” landed them the “best contemporary artist” award.

Track listing

I Am a Fadget (5:35)
Taximan (2:55)
Inda Inda Indaba (3:49)
Junk Jive, Part One (4:54)
Shadows (4:52)
Dun Kalusin Ta Va (3:05)
Urban Warrior (5:40)
I am a Fadget* (Alternate Mix) (5:30)
Shadows* (Alternate Version) (5:00)
Jiving to the Weekend Beat* (3:34)
Race of Tan* (4:26)
Jeremiah and Josephine* (3:52)
Bonus tracks on Sheer Sound's 2008 CD re-issue.
All songs are written by Lucien and Erik Windrich, except for lyrics on "Taximan" by Karl A. Windrich, and "Inda Inda Indaba" written by Lucien, Erik and Karl Windrich.

References

1984 debut albums
ÉVoid albums